Winifred Mary Tarinyeba Kiryabwire (born c. 1976), (née: Winifred Mary Tarinyeba), is a Ugandan lawyer, academic and businesswoman who is the chairperson of DFCU Bank, a large commercial bank in that East African country. She was appointed to that position effective 1 April 2022.

Early life and education
She is Ugandan by birth. She attended local primary and secondary schools. Her first degree, a Bachelor of Laws, was obtained from Makerere University, the oldest and largest public university in Uganda. She went on to obtain the Diploma in Legal Practice, from the Law Development Centre, in Kampala, the capital and largest city in that country. Her second degree, a Master of Laws, was awarded by the University of Cambridge in the United Kingdom. She has two more degrees; one is the Master of Science of Law and the other is the Doctor of Science of Law, both awarded by Stanford Law School, in the United States.

Career
As of April 2022, Kiryabwire has over 20 years of legal and business experience. She is an associate professor at Makerere University School of Law. She also serves as a non-executive director at DFCU Bank.

She has previously served as a member of the board of directors of Makerere University Holdings Limited, the business arm of the university. She was a member of the International Ethics Standards Board for Accountants (IESBA). She was the founding chairperson of the Women Business Advisory Council at DFCU Bank, from where she joined the bank's board as a non-executive director.

Personal life
Winifred Kiryabwire is married to Justice Geoffrey Kiryabwire of the Court of Appeal of Uganda. Together they are the parents of one daughter, Mary Kirabo Kiryabwire.

See also
 Sylvia Tamale
 Agnes Tibayeita Isharaza

References

External links
 Personal Profile at LinkedIn.com

1976 births
Living people
Ugandan women lawyers
21st-century Ugandan lawyers
Makerere University alumni
Law Development Centre alumni
People from Eastern Region, Uganda
Stanford University alumni
Alumni of the University of Cambridge
21st-century women lawyers
DFCU Bank people